Jacques Rougeau Jr. (born June 13, 1960) is a Canadian former professional wrestler best known for his appearances in the 1980s and 1990s with the World Wrestling Federation. He began his career under his real name as half of the tag team The Fabulous Rougeaus with his brother Raymond Rougeau. In 1991, he began a singles career as The Mountie, winning the WWF Intercontinental Heavyweight Championship once. In 1993, he formed three time WWF Tag Team Championship winning tag team The Quebecers with Pierre Ouellet.

Professional wrestling career
At least 3 of Jacques' family members were wrestling promoters and/or wrestled themselves: his older brother Ray,  his father Jacques Sr., and his uncle Jean "Johnny" Rougeau. Jacques' sister Johanne also promoted wrestling matches in Montreal, and brother Armand wrestled for smaller federations.

Early career (1977–1985) 
Jacques Rougeau began his career in 1977, working in Stu Hart's Calgary, Alberta based Stampede Wrestling promotion. In the 1980s he began wrestling in the United States, achieving success in Alabama and Tennessee, and in 1985 he and Ray were signed by the World Wrestling Federation.

World Wrestling Federation

The Rougeau Brothers (1986–1990)

Jacques debuted in the WWE (then WWF) on February 26, 1986 during the Australian leg of the company's  International Tour, in a losing effort against Moondog Rex. Raymond, who was victorious in his debut match against Moondog Spot the same night, debuted alongside Jacques 6 days later, winning their debut match as The Fabulous Rougeaus against the Moondogs.In their first year in the WWE, the Fabulous Rougeaus claimed tag-team victories against The Hart Foundation (Bret Hart and Jim Neidhart), The Moondogs, Jimmy Jack and Dory Funk Jr., and The Dream Team (Greg Valentine and Brutus Beefcake),.

Although they lost their match at WrestleMania III in 1987 to Valentine and Beefcake, they briefly upset The Hart Foundation for the WWF Tag Team Championship at the Montreal Forum on August 10 that year. The decision was reversed to a disqualification and the championship returned, since the challengers initially won after using Jimmy Hart's megaphone as a weapon.

After two years in the Federation, The Fabulous Rougeaus turned heel. The Canadian brothers began being announced as "From Canada, but soon to relocate to the United States" and debuted an intentionally annoying entrance song, in which they sang (partly in French) about being "All-American Boys" and their manager, Jimmy Hart. They were also briefly billed from Memphis, Hart's home city. They mockingly waved tiny American flags to the chagrin of many American fans. They would humorously attempt to start "USA!" chants, which led to further negative fan "heat". According to Jacques, the widespread antipathy of American fans inspired Vince McMahon to turn them into heels. They feuded with The Killer Bees, The Hart Foundation (who had turned face in between), The Bushwhackers, and The Rockers during their heel run.

The Mountie (1991–1992)
Ray Rougeau retired in early 1990, ending his tag-team partnership with Jaqcues. Jacques departed the Federation for a year before redebuting in January 1991, once again alongside Jimmy Hart. The Mountie character was that of a corrupt, cattle prod-wielding member of the Royal Canadian Mounted Police, who often boasted that he "always gets his man" (a phrase long associated with the RCMP, which insinuated that criminals cannot escape from Canada's federal police force).  The cattle prod came into play as part of The Mountie's post-match gimmick, where he would handcuff, berate and then "shock" his defeated and helpless opponents in the stomach. The story of the character change was that Jacques Rougeau had actually gone through the training to become a Mountie to wield authority.  The character was eventually the subject of litigation in Canada, preventing Rougeau from performing as The Mountie in his home country. Thus, while wrestling in Canada, he was billed using only his real name and did not wear his Mountie-inspired hat and jacket to the ring, although he did retain other parts of his costume such as red shirt, black pants, and boots.

The Mountie made his in-ring debut in January 1991. In his pay-per-view debut, he defeated Koko B. Ware at the 1991 Royal Rumble. He gained another major victory at WrestleMania VII, defeating Tito Santana after using the shock stick. The Mountie began a feud with the Big Boss Man after declaring that he was the sole legitimate law enforcer in the WWF, and on August 26, 1991, he spent a night in prison (kayfabe) after Bossman defeated him in a Jailhouse Match at SummerSlam. At the 1991 Survivor Series, Mountie teamed with Ric Flair, Ted DiBiase and The Warlord to defeat Roddy Piper, Bret Hart, Virgil and Davey Boy Smith in a four-on-four Survivor Series elimination match.

The Mountie's greatest achievement as a singles wrestler came when he won the WWF Intercontinental Heavyweight Championship in an upset over Bret Hart on January 17, 1992. In the storyline, Hart was suffering from the flu (Hart was actually going through contract negotiations). The Mountie lost the title just two days later to Rowdy Roddy Piper at the 1992 Royal Rumble, in what was one of the shortest Intercontinental Heavyweight Championship reigns. The Mountie received a rematch at the February 8 Saturday Night's Main Event XXX, but when he attempted to use his shock stick, it had no effect as Piper was wearing a rubber vest under his T-shirt. Piper removed his shirt after the match to reveal the vest, which was labeled "Shock Proof". Piper won the match after using the shock stick on The Mountie.

For the next several months, The Mountie primarily appeared in the undercard. He was on the losing end of an eight-man tag team match at WrestleMania VIII and a six-man tag team match at SummerSlam. He feuded with Sgt. Slaughter after shocking him with an extra large cattle prod on an episode of Superstars, though the subsequent matches all took place on house shows that summer, with no conclusion on television. After losing to then WWF World Heavyweight Champion Bret Hart in seventy-five seconds on October 26, 1992, Rougeau left the WWF.

The Quebecers (1993–1994)

Jacques returned to the WWF in July 1993. Shortly thereafter, Rougeau began tagging with Pierre Ouellet as The Quebecers.  The team, who feuded with Steiner Brothers, Men on a Mission, The Headshrinkers, and Marty Jannetty and The 1–2–3 Kid, were three-time WWF Tag Team Champions. The Quebecers characters were an extension of the earlier Mountie-theme, albeit with a more casual costume and an emphasis on bullying behavior. The pair (who were managed by Johnny Polo) emphasized their detachment from the earlier Mountie controversy by using a doctored version of Jacques's second Mountie theme song, titled "We're Not The Mounties", with the lyrics modified to insult the RCMP - for example, "because the Mountie always gets his man" became "unlike the Mounties, we always get our man". Jacques participated in the main event of the 1993 Survivor Series as a member of the "Foreign Fanatics" team. At the Royal Rumble, The Quebecers defeated Bret Hart and Owen Hart by referee stoppage to retain the WWF Tag Team Championship. At WrestleMania X, The Quebecers faced Men on a Mission for the WWF Tag Team Championship and retained after getting counted out. They lost the title to Men on a Mission in an unplanned title change at a house show on March 29, 1994, in London, England. Mabel stunned Pierre who couldn't kick out as he was supposed to. The wrong was righted as they won the belts back on March 31 at another house show. They lost the championship to The Headshrinkers on the April 26 episode of Raw and split up soon after.

Retirement match (1994)
The Quebecers broke up at a house show in the Montreal Forum on June 25, 1994. After a loss to The Headshrinkers, Pierre and Polo turned on Rougeau. After a few minutes of Jacques being attacked in front of his hometown crowd, Raymond Rougeau (who by this point was an announcer for the WWF's French-language broadcasts) ran to the ring to save his brother. This angle led to Jacques Rougeau's first retirement match, which, over the next few months, was heavily promoted on WWF TV shows broadcast in the Montreal area and in the local media. The match, held on October 21, 1994, drew a sell-out crowd of 16,843 to the Montreal Forum, and resulted in a victory for Jacques, when he pinned Pierre following a seated tombstone piledriver. Jacques, who was accompanied by Raymond, used Queen's song "We Are the Champions" as his theme music for the night.

World Championship Wrestling (1996–1998)
On September 9, 1996, Rougeau came out of retirement reuniting with Ouellet as they debuted as The Amazing French Canadians in World Championship Wrestling in a losing effort against The Nasty Boys. In 1997, Jacques became one of few wrestlers to cleanly defeat then-WCW Heavyweight Champion Hollywood Hogan, claiming a singles victory at the Molson Centre in Montreal. On the Right After Wrestling program on Sirius Satellite Radio Channel 98, Jacques told hosts Arda Ocal and Jimmy Korderas that Hogan put him over because of his respect for the Rougeau family name and for keeping a clean wrestling image. On Colt Cabana's Art of Wrestling podcast, Rougeau's former student, Kevin Owens stated that there is a rumor that Hogan lay down for Rougeau for an additional $10,000 payment. Rougeau said that he paid and organized the show, so it was a Jacques Rougeau show, not a WCW show.

Later career and retirement (1997–2018)
Rougeau teamed up with his brother, Ray (who at the time was a commentator, announcer and host for the French-produced WWF programming) alongside Ouellet in a dark match for WWF Shotgun Saturday Night in 1997. They defeated the team of Edge, Shawn Stasiak, and Tom Brandi.

In 1998, Rougeau returned to the WWF for a final run teaming once again with Pierre Ouellet in an updated version of The Quebecers. This incarnation of the team still used the ring attire from their WCW run as the Amazing French Canadians. The team were also one of the 14 tag teams eliminated in the tag team battle royal at WrestleMania XIV, leading to a win for the Legion of Doom. They failed to achieve the same success they enjoyed during their prior run, with their only notable feud being with The Godwinns, where the Godwinns went over. Rougeau and Ouellet briefly reunited in WCW in 2000 in Lance Storm's Team Canada.

After retiring, Rougeau attempted to join the Montreal Police Department, but was unable to do so as he had not graduated from high school. He is now a public speaker, touring schools to speak on drugs, smoking, and bullying. He opened the Rougeau Wrestling School in Montreal in 1998.

In 2018, Rougeau announced that he would retire for a third time, and that he had closed his wrestling school.  On August 18, 2018, shortly after his retirement announcement, Rougeau mirrored his father's retirement matching by teaming with his sons for the first and only time. As Rougeau's sons, all of whom have wrestled, have expressed no desire to return to wrestling, Jacques' retirement effectively ended the Rougeau family wrestling dynasty after more than six decades.

Personal life
Rougeau is divorced from Nathalie Thibodeau, whom he married in 1978. He and Thibodeau had three sons: Cedric, Emile, and Jean-Jacques. Former NHL ice hockey defenceman Denis Gauthier is Rougeau's nephew.

Championships and accomplishments
Central States Wrestling
NWA Central States Tag Team Championship (1 time) – with Bruce Reed
Continental Wrestling Association
AWA Southern Heavyweight Championship (2 times)
NWA Mid-America Heavyweight Championship (2 times)
Southeastern Championship Wrestling
NWA Alabama Heavyweight Championship (1 time)
NWA Southeastern Heavyweight Championship (Northern Division) (1 time)
Lutte Internationale
Canadian International Tag Team Championship (4 times) – with Raymond Rougeau
Lutte Internationale 2000
Johnny Rougeau Tag Team Championship (1 Time) – with Raymond Rougeau
Pro Wrestling Illustrated
PWI ranked him #41 of the 500 best singles wrestlers of the year in the PWI 500 in 1992
PWI ranked him # 222 of the 500 best singles wrestlers of the PWI Years in 2003.
PWI ranked him # 83 of the 100 best tag teams of the PWI Years with Pierre Ouellet in 2003.
World Wrestling Federation
WWF Intercontinental Heavyweight Championship (1 time)
WWF Tag Team Championship (3 times) – with Pierre Ouellet

References

External links 
 
 
 SLAM! Wrestling profile of the Rougeau Family

1960 births
Canadian male professional wrestlers
Canadian people of French descent
Living people
Professional wrestlers from Quebec
WWF/WWE Intercontinental Champions
Stampede Wrestling alumni
20th-century professional wrestlers
The Stud Stable members